Harry Childs may refer to:

Harry Childs (actor), husband of Bessie Toner
Harry Childs (rugby league), played in 1910 New Zealand rugby league season
Harry Childs, on List of Bowls England champions

See also
Henry Childs (disambiguation)
Harry Child (disambiguation)